The Bishop of Hull is an episcopal title used by a suffragan bishop of the Church of England Diocese of York, England. The suffragan bishop, along with the Bishop of Selby and the Bishop of Whitby, assists the Archbishop of York in overseeing the diocese.

The title takes its name after the city of Kingston upon Hull and was first created under the Suffragan Bishops Act 1534. Today, the Bishop of Hull is responsible for the Archdeaconry of the East Riding.

List of bishops

References

External links
 Crockford's Clerical Directory - Listings

 
Anglican suffragan bishops in the Diocese of York
Bishops